The sexual abuse scandal in Haiti arose in 2007, accusing the United Nations peacekeepers, mainly of the Sri Lankan peacekeeping contingent, of committing immoral sexual abuse among other offenses of sexual misconduct during the United Nations Stabilisation Mission in Haiti. In 2016, the Sri Lankan government decided to make a one-time ex-gratia payment to a victim and child born as a result of sexual exploitation and abuse, which was praised by the UN.

Background
In November 2007, 114 members of the 950 member Sri Lankan Army peacekeeping mission in Haiti were accused of sexual misconduct and abuse. 108 members, including 3 officers of the 950-member-strong Sri Lanka peacekeeping contingent, were sent back after being implicated in alleged misconduct and sexual abuse.

Officials in Haiti have said that UN peacekeeping soldiers from Sri Lanka who had been accused of sex crimes in 2007 had even raped children as young as 7 years old. The UN released a report slapping the Sri Lankan contingent with accusations of building a brothel in Martissant, Port-au-Prince charging them with systematic sexual exploitation and sexual abuse of minors, prostitution and rape. "In exchange for sex, the children received small amounts of money, food, and sometimes mobile phones,” reported the OIOS, the UN's investigative arm.

Investigations and reactions
After inquiry into the case the UN Office of Internal Oversight Services (OIOS) has concluded, ‘acts of sexual exploitation and abuse (against children) were frequent and occurred usually at night, and at virtually every location where the contingent personnel were deployed.’ The OIOS said charges should include statutory rape "because it involves children under 18 years of age".

UN spokeswoman Michele Montas said: "The United Nations and the Sri Lankan government deeply regret any sexual exploitation and abuse that has occurred." The Sri Lankan Officials claim that there is little tangible evidence on this case.

Noted Haitian female activist Ezhili Danto alleges:

In March 2013, a fresh batch of 400 soldiers from the Sri Lankan Army's Sinha Regiment left for Haiti as part of the UN Peacekeeping mission.

See also

 United Nations Stabilisation Mission in Haiti
 Sri Lankan Army

References

2007 in Haiti
History of the Sri Lanka Army
Sexual abuse cover-ups
Wartime sexual violence
Sex crimes in North America
Violence against women in Haiti
Forced prostitution
Sex gangs
Child sexual abuse in Haiti